Nancy Gutierrez is an American politician and former math teacher. She is a Democratic member of the Arizona House of Representatives elected to represent District 18 in 2022.

Life 
Gutierrez earned a B.S. in elementary education with an emphasis in mathematics from the Northern Arizona University in 1994. 

Gutierrez began teaching in Arizona in 1994. She has taught preschool, elementary, high school, and community college mathematics. She moved to Tucson, Arizona with her children and husband in 2007. In 2009, she began teaching yoga. Gutierrez is a certified yoga teacher. In 2010, she was elected president of the Manzanita Elementary School Family Faculty Organization. In 2013, she began teaching at Tucson High Magnet School. Gutierrez is a member of the Tucson Education Association and the Arizona Education Association. In 2018, she was elected president of the Tucson chapter of the National Organization for Women.  

In 2022, she was elected to represent district 18 of the Arizona House of Representatives.

References

External links 

 Biography at Ballotpedia

Democratic Party members of the Arizona House of Representatives
Living people
Year of birth missing (living people)
21st-century American women politicians
21st-century American women educators
21st-century American educators
Schoolteachers from Arizona
Politicians from Tucson, Arizona
American yoga teachers
Women state legislators in Arizona